Oyanaisis Gelis González (born October 21, 1983) is a Cuban women's basketball player. Playing as a guard she won the gold medal with the Cuba women's national basketball team at the 2003 Pan American Games in Santo Domingo, Dominican Republic. Her first name is sometimes also spelled as Oyanaisy.

She was a member of the team which competed for Cuba at the 2015 Pan American Games, winning a bronze medal.

References
 FIBA Profile

1983 births
Living people
Cuban women's basketball players
Sportspeople from Santiago de Cuba
Basketball players at the 2003 Pan American Games
Basketball players at the 2007 Pan American Games
Guards (basketball)
Basketball players at the 2015 Pan American Games
Pan American Games bronze medalists for Cuba
Pan American Games gold medalists for Cuba
Pan American Games medalists in basketball
Central American and Caribbean Games gold medalists for Cuba
Competitors at the 2006 Central American and Caribbean Games
Central American and Caribbean Games medalists in basketball
Medalists at the 2003 Pan American Games
Medalists at the 2007 Pan American Games
Medalists at the 2015 Pan American Games
21st-century Cuban women